Maimai Wanwan Rural LLG is a local-level government (LLG) of Sandaun Province, Papua New Guinea. Maimai languages are spoken in the LLG.

Wards
01. Yimin
02. Nau'alu
03. Gamu/Ulap
04. Yimut
05. Wundu
06. Yimauwi
07. Yauwo
08. Maimai
09. Aimukuli
10. Mukili (Beli language speakers)
11. Yulem
12. Yemeraba
13. Wemil
14. Leiko (Laeko language speakers)
15. Waniwomoko

References

Local-level governments of Sandaun Province